Osogbo  (also Oṣogbo, rarely Oshogbo) is a city in Nigeria. It became the capital city of Osun State in 1991. Osogbo city seats the Headquarters of both Osogbo Local Government Area (situated at Oke Baale Area of the city) and Olorunda Local Government Area (situated at Igbonna Area of the city). It is some 88 kilometers by road northeast of Ibadan. Osogbo shares boundaries with Ikirun, Ilesa, Ede, Egbedore, Ogbomosho and Iragbiji and is easily accessible from any part of the state because of its central nature. It is about 48 km from Ife, 32 km from Ilesa, 46 km from Iwo, 48 km from Ikire and 46 km from Ila-Orangun; The city had a population of about 500,000  people and an approximate land area of 2875 km2  the postal code of the area is 230.

Infrastructure and demographics

Osogbo lies on the railway line from Lagos to Kano. It is known for the Osogbo School of Art and the Oja Oba Market building, said to be the former Oba's palace, within yards of the Osogbo Grand Mosque.

Osogbo is the trade center for a farming region. Yams, cassava, grain, and tobacco are grown. Cotton is grown and used to weave cloth. It is also home to several hotels and a football stadium with a capacity of 10,000 and a second division professional league team.

Most of the population are members of the Yoruba ethnic group.
In 1988, about 27% of the population were engaged in farming as their primary occupation, 8% were traders and about 30% clerks and teachers.

Culture 

Osogbo, sometimes called "Ilu Aro" (home of dyeing), is a major dyeing center. The traditional industry is one of the major industries of Osogbo and the different types of Adire in Osogbo includes Raffia Resist-Adire Oniko, Stitch Resist-Adire Alabere, Starch Resist-Adire Eleko, Wax Batik-Adire Alabele. A number of industries also began to rise after independence, notably small scale establishments involved in textile, foam making, and pencils. Osogbo was made a major industrial development center by the government of Nigeria during the 1970s. Osogbo is also the childhood home of the actor and dramatist Duro Ladipo and the Muslim scholar Sheikh Adelabu.

Osogbo is the venue of the annual Osun-Osogbo festival along the River Osun. The festival is centered on the sacred grove of the river goddess Ọsun, which is a UNESCO World Heritage Site.

The city is also home to several progressive groups and associations, such as the Osogbo Descendants Progressive Union (ODPU; formerly Osogbo Progressive Union - OPU), the Mbari Mbayo Club for African writers, artists and musicians, the Osogbo Professionals' Initiative (OPI), the Osogbo Affairs, the Osogbo Development Action Group (ODAG), the Osogbo National Students' Union (ONSU), the Oroki Social Club (OSC), the Ataoja Palace Project Initiative (APPI), the United Associates Osogbo and the Igbonna Progressive Club.

Climate
Osogbo has a tropical climate with rainfall and an average annual temperature of 25.5 degrees Celsius (77.8 degrees Fahrenheit) and 1361 Millimetres (53.6 inches) of precipitation.

History 

According to tradition, In Ipole Omu, seven rulers reigned before Olarooye in the following succession: Adefokanbale, Aikanya, Ogbogba, Saso, Luberin, Laege (also known as Adetuturinrin; father to both Lajomo and Larooye), Lajomo and Olarooye.

During the reign of Oba Olarooye at Ipole, life became very unbearable because of incessant dry seasons. The then Ipole people became much dejected, worried and uncomfortable over their losses involving their farms, domestic animals and human beings. The Oba Olarooye was worried and disheartened by the situation at Ipole Omu. He wanted emergency solutions to inevitable and uncountable losses. This was the time he ordered the chief hunter at Ipole-in the person of Timehin-and his co-hunters to go on expedition and look for greener pastures. Timehin and the other hunters courageously took up the challenge and moved out in search of a better place for settlement. The expedition discovered River Osun.

Yoruba tradition claims many people fleeing the Fulani Invasion settled at Osogbo following the fall of old Oyo. As a result, Osogbo increased in population largely due to migration from other Yoruba towns.

For want of a more open place than a grove and a more central location, Olarooye and his people abandoned their settlement, including the already flourishing market and moved to Ode-Osogbo. At Ode-Osogbo, Olarooye built his new palace at the present-day Idi-Osun while Timehin built the Ogun shrine now known as Idi-Ogun.
Since then, Osogbo has maintained its function as an economic center.

List of Ataojas (traditional kings)

The Ataoja  which means the one that "stretches out his hand and takes the fish"  is the traditional ruler of the people of Osogbo. The following is the list of the Ataojas of Osogbo, with the dates of their rule:
Oba Larooye Gbadewolu (died 1760)
Oba Sogbodede (died 1780)
Aina Serebu (1780–1810)
Abogbe (1810–1812; as Regent, she reigned but did not assume the title Ataoja)
Obodegbewale (1812–1815; as Regent)
Oba Lahanmi Oyipi (1815–1840)
Oba Ojo Adio Okege (1840–1854)
Oba Oladejobi Oladele Matanmi I (1854–1864)
Oba Fabode.Durosinmi Ogunnike (1864–1891)
Oba Bamigbola Alao (1891–1893)
Oba Ajayi Olosunde Oyetona (1893–1903)
Oba Atanda Olukeye Olugbeja Matanmi II (1903–1917)
Oba Kofoworola Ajadi Latona I (1918–1920)
Oba Alabi Kolawole (1920–1933)
Oba Samuel Oyedokun Latona II (1933–1943)
Oba Samuel Adeleye Adenle I (1944–1976)
Oba Iyiola Oyewale Matanmi III (1976–2010)
Oba Jimoh Olaonipekun Oyetunji Larooye II (2010–)

References

External links 

 Osun-Osogbo Sacred Grove World Heritage Site
A Brief History of the Ataoja of Osogbo
Welcome to Osogbocity Homepage

 
Local Government Areas in Osun State
State capitals in Nigeria
Cities in Yorubaland
Cities in Nigeria